Freddy Head (born 19 June 1947, in Neuilly, France) is a retired champion jockey in Thoroughbred horse racing and currently a horse trainer. Known also as "Freddie", his grandfather was a jockey as was his father Alec Head who also became a successful  trainer and owner of Haras du Quesnay near Deauville. Alec Head's horses won The Derby and the Prix de l'Arc de Triomphe.

In the 1976 Prix de l'Arc de Triomphe, Freddie Head rode to victory on a horse trained by his father and in 1979 took another win on a horse trained by his highly successful sister, Christiane "Criquette" Head. A six-time winner of the French jockey's championship, Freddie Head scored a number of important Group I wins in the United Kingdom and is best known to Americans for his back-to-back victories aboard U.S. Hall of Fame filly Miesque in the 1987 and 1988 Breeders' Cup Mile.

Freddie Head retired as a jockey in 1997 and began working as a trainer. In 2008, he became the first man ever to win Breeders' Cup races as both a jockey and trainer when Goldikova won the Mile.

Major wins as a jockey
 France
 Critérium de Saint-Cloud – (2) - Providential (1979), Poliglote (1994))
 Grand Critérium (Prix Jean-Luc Lagardère) - (2) - Saint Cyrien (1982), Hector Protector (1990)
 Grand Prix de Paris - (2) - Dhaudevi (1968), Chapparal (1969)
 Grand Prix de Saint-Cloud - (3) - Riverqueen (1976), Exceller (1977), Gay Mecene (1979)
 Poule d'Essai des Poulains - (6) - Green Dancer (1975), Red Lord (1976), Blushing John (1988), Linamix (1990), Hector Protector (1991), Shanghai (1992)
 Poule d'Essai des Pouliches - (8) - Ivanjica (1975), Riverqueen (1976), Dancing Maid (1978), Three Troikas (1979), Silvermine (1985), Miesque (1987), Matiara (1995), Always Loyal (1997)
 Prix de l'Abbaye de Longchamp - (2) - Pentathlon (1967), Sigy (1978)
 Prix de l'Arc de Triomphe - (4) - Bon Mot (1966), San San (1972), Ivanjica (1976), Three Troikas (1979)
 Prix d'Astarté - (6) - Carabella (1967), Prudent Miss (1970), Thorough (1982), Northern Aspen (1985), Navratilovna (1986), Hydro Calido (1992)
 Prix du Cadran - (2) - Gold River (1981), Karkour (1983)
 Prix de Diane - (4) - Pistol Packer (1971), Reine de Saba (1978), Harbour (1982), Lacovia (1986)
 Prix de la Forêt - (5) - Barbare (1966), Regent Street (1968), Lyphard (1972), Ma Biche (1983), Septieme Ciel (1990)
 Prix Ganay - (1) - Baillamont (1986)
 Prix d'Ispahan - (4) - Riverman (1972), Carwhite (1978), Baillamont (1986), Miesque (1988)
 Prix Jacques le Marois - (6) - Carabella (1967), Lyphard (1972), Northjet (1981), Miesque (1987 & 1988), Hector Protector (1991)
 Prix Jean Prat - (2) - Riverman (1972), Le Triton (1996)
 Prix du Jockey-Club - (4) - Goodly (1969), Roi Lear (1973), Val de l'Orne (1975), Youth (1976)
 Prix Lupin - (4) - Green Dancer (1975), Youth (1976), Cudas (1991), Johann Quatz (1992)
 Prix Marcel Boussac - (2) - Miesque (1986), Macoumba (1994)
 Prix Maurice de Gheest - (1) - Anabaa (1996)
 Prix Morny - (4) - Daring Display (1971), Princesse Lida (1979), Machiavellian (1989), Hector Protector (1990)
 Prix du Moulin de Longchamp - (3) - Kilijaro (1980), Northjet (1981), Miesque (1987)
 Prix de l'Opéra - (1) - Reine Mathilde (1984)
 Prix Royal-Oak - (6) - Dhaudevi (1968), Bourbon (1971), Busiris (1974), Gold River (1980), Agent Double (1984), Top Sunrise (1989)
 Prix Saint-Alary - (9) - Tidra (1967), Pistol Packer (1971), Riverqueen (1976), Reine de Saba (1978), Three Troikas (1979), Harbour (1982), Fitnah (1985), Lacovia (1986), Treble (1991)
 Prix de la Salamandre - (8) - Delmora (1974), Princesse Lida (1979), Maximova (dead-heat, 1982), Baiser Vole (1985), Miesque (1986), Common Grounds (1987), Machiavellian (1989), Hector Protector (1990)
 Prix Vermeille - (3) - Pistol Packer (1971), Dancing Maid (1978), Three Troikas (1979)

 Canada
 E. P. Taylor Stakes - (1) - Devalois (1985)

 Germany
 Grosser Preis von Berlin - (1) - Lydian (1981)

 Great Britain
 1,000 Guineas - (2) - Ma Biche (1983), Miesque (1987)
 2,000 Guineas - (1) - Zino (1982)
 Cheveley Park Stakes - (2) - Ma Biche (1982), Pas de Reponse (1996)
 Cork and Orrery Stakes (Golden Jubilee Stakes) - (1) - King's Company (1971)
 July Cup - (1) - Anabaa (1996)
 Racing Post Trophy - (1) - Green Dancer (1974)

 Ireland
 Irish 2,000 Guineas - (1) - King's Company (1971)
 National Stakes - (1) - King's Company (1970)

 Italy
 Gran Premio del Jockey Club - (1) - Authi (1974)
 Gran Premio di Milano - (1) - Beau Charmeur (1972)

 United States
 Breeders' Cup Mile - (2) - Miesque (1987 & 1988)

Major wins as a trainer
 France
 Prix de l'Abbaye de Longchamp - (1) - Marchand d'Or (2008)
 Prix de la Forêt - (2) - Goldikova (2010), Moonlight Cloud (2013)
 Prix d'Ispahan - (3) - Goldikova (2010, 2011), Solow (2015)
 Prix du Cadran - (1) - Call The Wind (2018)
 Prix Jacques Le Marois - (3) - Tamayuz (2008), Goldikova (2009), Moonlight Cloud (2013)
 Prix Jean-Luc Lagardère - (1) - Naaqoos (2008)
 Prix Jean Prat - (2) - Tamayuz (2008), Charm Spirit (2014)
 Prix Maurice de Gheest - (6) - Marchand d'Or (2006, 2007, 2008), Moonlight Cloud (2011, 2012, 2013)
 Prix du Moulin de Longchamp - (3) - Goldikova (2008), Moonlight Cloud (2012), Charm Spirit (2014)
 Prix de l'Opéra - (1) - We Are (2014)
 Prix Rothschild - (5) - Goldikova (2008, 2009, 2010, 2011), With You (2018)
 Prix Saint-Alary - (1) - Queen's Jewel (2015)
 Prix Vermeille - (1) - Galikova (2011)

 Great Britain
 Falmouth Stakes - (1) - Goldikova (2009)
 July Cup - (1) - Marchand d'Or (2008)
 Queen Anne Stakes - (2) - Goldikova (2010), Solow (2015)
 Queen Elizabeth II Stakes - (2) - Charm Spirit (2014), Solow (2015)
 Sussex Stakes - (1) - Solow (2015)

 United States
 Breeders' Cup Mile - (3) - Goldikova (2008, 2009, 2010)

 United Arab Emirates
 Dubai Turf - (1) - Solow (2015)

References
 Freddie Head at the NTRA

French jockeys
French horse trainers
French people of English descent
1947 births
Living people
English Racing Colony at Chantilly